van der Auwera is a surname. Notable people with the surname include:

Ferdinand Van der Auwera (born 1929), pseudonym Fernand Auwera, Belgian writer
Jan Van Der Auwera (1924–2004), Belgian footballer
Johan van der Auwera (born 1953), Belgian linguist
Marcel Van Der Auwera (born 1923), Belgian fencer

Surnames of Dutch origin